Suomen Robinson was the Finnish reality television program debuted in 2004. In the spring of 2004 Nelonen purchased the broadcast rights to air their own version of Expedition Robinson. Seeing the success of the Danish, Norwegian, and Swedish versions of the show TV4 assumed that their own version would also be a huge success. They were wrong in their assumption and due to competition from shows like Big Brother after two seasons the show was cancelled due to low ratings.

The name alludes to both Robinson Crusoe and The Swiss Family Robinson, two stories featuring people marooned by shipwrecks.

Format
The Robinson format was developed by Planet 24, a United Kingdom TV production company owned by Charlie Parsons and Bob Geldof. Their company Castaway Television Productions retained the rights to the concept when they sold Planet 24 in 1999. Mark Burnett later licensed the format to create the American show Survivor in 2000.

Sixteen contestants are put into a survival situation and compete in a variety of physical challenges. Early in each season two tribes compete but later on the tribes are merged and the competitions become individual. At the end of each episode, one contestant is eliminated from the show by the others in a secret "island council" ballot.

Seasons

External links
 http://iki.fi/tku/srobinson/srobinson2004.htm

 
Finland
2004 Finnish television series debuts
2005 Finnish television series endings
Finnish reality television series
Nelonen original programming